Fraser Beer (born 23 September 1949) is a New Zealand sailor. He competed in the Dragon event at the 1972 Summer Olympics.

References

External links
 

1949 births
Living people
New Zealand male sailors (sport)
Olympic sailors of New Zealand
Sailors at the 1972 Summer Olympics – Dragon
Sportspeople from Palmerston North